A lysis buffer is a buffer solution used for the purpose of breaking open cells for use in molecular biology experiments that analyze the labile macromolecules of the cells (e.g. western blot for protein, or for DNA extraction). Most lysis buffers contain buffering salts (e.g. Tris-HCl) and ionic salts (e.g. NaCl) to regulate the pH and osmolarity of the lysate. Sometimes detergents (such as Triton X-100 or SDS) are added to break up membrane structures. For lysis buffers targeted at protein extraction, protease inhibitors are often included, and in difficult cases may be almost required. Lysis buffers can be used on both animal and plant tissue cells.

Choosing a buffer 
The primary purpose of lysis buffer is isolating the molecules of interest and keeping them in a stable environment. For proteins, for some experiments, the target proteins should be completely denatured, while in some other experiments the target protein should remain folded and functional. Different proteins also have different properties and are found in different cellular environments. Thus, it is essential to choose the best buffer based on the purpose and design of the experiments. The important factors to be considered are: pH, ionic strength, usage of detergent, protease inhibitors to prevent proteolytic processes. For example, detergent addition is necessary when lysing Gram-negative bacteria, but not for Gram-positive bacteria. It is common that a protease inhibitor is added to lysis buffer, along with other enzyme inhibitors of choice, such as a phosphatase inhibitor when studying proteins with phosphorylation.

Components

Buffer 
Buffer creates an environment for isolated proteins. Each buffer choice has a specific pH range, so the buffer should be chosen based on whether the experiment's target protein is stable under a certain pH. Also, for buffers with similar pH ranges, it is important to consider whether the buffer is compatible with  the experiment's target protein. The table below contains several most commonly used buffers and their pH ranges.

Additives

Salts 
Lysis buffer usually contains one or more salts. The function of salts in lysis buffer is to establish an ionic strength in the buffer solution. Some of the most commonly used salts are NaCl, KCl, and (NH4)2SO4. They are usually used with a concentration between 50 and 150 mM.

Detergent 

Detergents are organic amphipathic (with hydrophobic tail and a hydrophilic head) surfactants. They are used to separate membrane proteins from membrane because the hydrophobic part of detergent can surround biological membranes and thus isolate membrane proteins from membranes. Although detergents are widely used and have similar functions, the physical and chemical properties of detergents of interest must be considered in light of the goals of an experiment.

Detergents are often categorized as nonionic, anionic, cationic, or zwitterionic, based on their hydrophilic head group feature.

Nonionic detergents like Triton X-100 and zwitterionic detergents like CHAPS (3-[(3-cholamidopropyl)dimethylammonio]-1-propanesulfonate) are nondenaturing (will not disrupt protein functions). Ionic detergents like sodium dodecyl sulfate (SDS) and cationic detergents like ethyl trimethyl ammonium bromide are denaturing (will disrupt protein functions). Detergents are a major ingredient that determines the lysis strength of a given lysis buffer.

Others 
Other additives include metal ions, sugar like glucose, glycerol, metal chelators (e.g. EDTA), and reducing agents like dithiothreitol (DTT).

Commonly used buffers

NP-40 lysis buffer 
It may be the most widely used lysis buffer. The solubilizing agent is NP-40, which can be replaced by other detergents at different concentrations. Since NP-40 is a nonionic detergent, this lysis buffer has a milder effect than RIPA buffer. It can be used when protein functions are to be retained with minimal disruption.

Recipe:
 150 mM NaCl
 1.0% Nonidet P-40 or Triton X-100
 50 mM Tris-Cl
 Adjust pH to 7.4

RIPA (RadioImmunoPrecipitation Assay) lysis buffer 
RIPA buffer is a commonly used lysis buffer for immunoprecipitation and general protein extraction from cells and tissues. The buffer can be stored without vanadate at 4 °C for up to 1 year. RIPA buffer releases proteins from cells as well as disrupts most weak interactions between proteins.

Recipe:
 1% (w/w) Nonidet P-40 (NP-40)
 1% (w/v) sodium deoxycholate
 0.1% (w/v) SDS
 0.15 M NaCl
 0.01 M sodium phosphate, pH 7.2
 2 mM EDTA
 50 mM sodium fluoride (NaF)
 0.2 mM fresh sodium orthovanadate (Na3VO4.2H2O, it has phosphatase inhibitor function because it mimics phosphate)
 100 U/ml protease inhibitor, such as aprotinin

SDS (sodium dodecyl sulfate) lysis buffer 
SDS is ionic denaturing detergent. Hot SDS buffer is often used when the proteins need to be completely solubilized and denatured.

Recipe:
 0.5% (w/v) SDS
 0.05 M Tris⋅Cl
 Adjust pH to 8.0
 Add 1 mM fresh dithiothreitol (DTT)

ACK (Ammonium-Chloride-Potassium) lysing buffer 
ACK is used for lysis of red blood cells in biological samples where other cells such as white blood cells are of greater interest.

Recipe:
 150 mM ammonium chloride
 10 mM potassium bicarbonate
 0.1 mM EDTA
 Adjust pH to 7.2-7.4

Lysis buffer in DNA and RNA studies 
In studies like DNA fingerprinting the lysis buffer is used for DNA isolation. Dish soap can be used in a pinch to break down the cell and nuclear membranes, allowing the DNA to be released. Other such lysis buffers include the proprietary Qiagen product Buffer P2.

References 

Laboratory techniques
Cell biology
DNA